The men's 200 metre individual medley event at the 11th FINA World Swimming Championships (25m) took place 14 December 2012 at the Sinan Erdem Dome.  The event was won by American Ryan Lochte.  In the final, Lochte broke his own world record of 1:50.08 set in 2010 with a time of 1:49.63, thus becoming the first individual under 1:50 in the event.

Records
Prior to this competition, the existing world and championship records were as follows.

The following records were established during the competition:

Results

Heats

Final

The final was held at 21:04.

References

External links
 2012 FINA World Swimming Championships (25 m): Men's 200 metre medley entry list , from OmegaTiming.com.

Individual medley 200 metre, men's
World Short Course Swimming Championships